Miloš Luković (born 18 November 2005) is a Serbian footballer currently playing as a forward for IMT.

Club career
Having scored 54 goals at youth level, and making his professional debut in late 2021, Luković attracted attention from English Premier League side Manchester City.

International career
Luković has represented Serbia at under-19 level.

Personal life
Luković's brother, Luka, is also a footballer, and has played professionally in Serbia, Switzerland and Belgium.

Career statistics

Club

Notes

References

2005 births
Living people
Serbian footballers
Serbia youth international footballers
Association football forwards
Serbian First League players
FK IMT players